John Edward (born 1969) is an American medium, author and television personality.

John Edward may also refer to:
John Edward (civil servant), EU and Scottish civil servant and campaigner
Johnny Edward, British musician, writer and record producer, creator of the TV robot character Metal Mickey
John Edward (MP) for Sandwich (UK Parliament constituency)
John and Edward Grimes, more commonly known as Jedward, Irish musicians

See also
John Edwards (disambiguation)